The Boyabat Dam is a concrete gravity dam on the Kızılırmak River bordering Sinop and Samsun Provinces, Turkey. Construction began in 2008 and the dam and power plant were completed in December 2012. Its primary purpose is to generate hydroelectric power. The dam's power plant has an installed capacity of 513 MW.

Background
Plans for the dam first began in 1958 when the Electrical Works Survey Administration studied the river for hydropower potential. By 1979, Turkey's State Hydraulic Works (DSI) and Japan's Electric Power Development Company completed feasibility studies. A final study and proposal was completed soon after. In 1986, DSI began preliminary works which included access roads and the diversion tunnels. Doğuş Holding was awarded the dam's tender on 18 September 1995. They signed a concession with Turkey's Ministry of Energy and Natural Resources on 22 October 1998. However, a license to operate the power plant was not awarded until 14 November 2007. Five Turkish banks had to fund US$750 million of the dam's US$1.2 billion price tag. The consortium owning the dam became Boyabat Elektrik. Construction on the dam began in April 2008, was delayed and restarted January 2012. The dam and power plant were accepted on 3 December 2012 and inaugurated nine days later.

Design and operation
A catchment area of  drains run-off into the reservoir. The dam passes flood waters with a gated weir spillway that is located on its crest. The spillway is controlled by six radial gates that pass water into six chutes. The chutes combine into three and flip buckets at their base dissipate energy. The dam's power station is embedded in its body at the base and contains three 171 MW Francis turbine-generators.

Impact
The dam lake that reaches 60 km up-river and covers an area of 65,4 km2 changed the lives of 16.593 people living there. The new year 2012-1013 when the dam started collecting water 8 villages were inundated completely and 28 villages partly. Agricultural fields (2.840 in number, and 28.400.000 m2 in area), buildings (3.145 in number) were lost to the waters. 
A total area of 72.180.000 m2 was expropriated for 879.970.000 TRL. 1.435 of the residents had applied for relocation, of these 75% wished agricultural setting, 25% wished urban setting. The list of villages affected were as follows: Those administratively under Sinop's Saraydüzü : Yaylacılı, Fakılı, Akbelen, Hacıçay, Yalmansaray, Those administratively under Samsun's Vezirköprü: Susuz, Darıçay, Aşağı Darıçay, Kızılkese, Alanköy, Those administratively under Çorum's Osmancık :  Aydın, Aşağı Zeytin, Yukarı Zeytin, Pelitçik, Aşıkbükü, Kalimavlağı, Those administratively under Çorum's Kargı : Avşar, Bağözü, Örencik, Saraycık, Sinanözü, Karaboya, Maksutlu, Köprübaşı, Demirören, Karapürçek, Gökçedoğan, and Karacaoğlan.

The 513 MW installed power capacity on the dam was 9% of the total Turkish electric power generation capacity of 56.759 MW. The investment was expected to generate 1 500 *106kWh per year worth 150 million TRL, a small but welcome correction to the 70% energy trade deficit of the country.  The 4 year construction period was also a temporary boon to the local economy.

See also

List of dams and reservoirs in Turkey

References

Dams in Sinop Province
Hydroelectric power stations in Turkey
Gravity dams
Dams completed in 2012
Dams on the Kızılırmak River
Energy infrastructure completed in 2012
2012 establishments in Turkey
Dams in Samsun Province
Kızılırmak
21st-century architecture in Turkey